Tavanasa Bridge, also known as Vorderrheinbrücke, Tavanasa is the name of the two reinforced concrete three hinged arch bridges designed by Swiss civil engineer Robert Maillart. The first of these was constructed in 1904, but later destroyed by an avalanche. The second, constructed in 1928 stands to this day.

History 

The previous bridge of 1904, saw a development in Maillart's own treatment of the arch. This bridge was a three-hinged reinforced concrete hollow box girder arch bridge, and unlike Maillart's previous bridge at Zuoz, saw the removal of the horizontal members of the box girder near the supports, which had experienced cracking. The replacement of the destroyed bridge however, became a high arch bridge through the insistence of the canton. Maillart's later Salginatobel Bridge re-uses a similar form.

Image gallery

References 

Bridges in Switzerland